is a Japanese politician of the Democratic Party of Japan, a member of the House of Representatives in the Diet (national legislature). A native of Fukue, Nagasaki, a Roman Catholic, and graduate of Waseda University, he was elected to the House of Representatives for the first time in 1993 after unsuccessful runs in 1979, 1986 and 1990. Before running for office, he worked as a rancher and a lawyer.

References

External links 
 Official website in Japanese.

1942 births
Living people
Democratic Party of Japan politicians
20th-century Japanese lawyers
Japanese Roman Catholics
Ministers of Agriculture, Forestry and Fisheries of Japan
Members of the House of Representatives (Japan)
Politicians from Nagasaki Prefecture
Ranchers
Waseda University alumni
21st-century Japanese politicians